Giant Records may refer to:
Giant Records (Warner), a joint venture record label
Giant Records (independent), an independent record label